Sofie Bloch Jørgensen (born 23 August 1991) is a Danish football player who plays as a forward for Genoa in Italian second division Serie B and has appeared for the Denmark women's national under-19 football team.

She has previously played for AGF, VSK Aarhus, Norwegian IL Sandviken, Brøndby IF, IK Skovbakken and Vejlby IK. In addition, she has also played college soccer in the United States for Lindsey Wilson College, from 2010 to 2013. When she joined Sandviken in 2017, this was her first professional contract. Prior to this, she was working as a hostess and disability assistant and studying to be a physiotherapist alongside her football career.

Honours

Club
Brøndby
Elitedivisionen:
Winner: 2016/17
Danish Women's Cup:
Winner: 2017

Sandviken
Norwegian Women's Cup:
Silver Medalist: 2018

References

External links
 Profile at the Danish Football Union
 
 Sofie Bloch Jørgensen - soccerdonna.de
 

1991 births
Living people
Danish women's footballers
Denmark women's international footballers
Danish expatriate women's footballers
Danish expatriate sportspeople in the United States
Expatriate women's soccer players in the United States
Danish expatriate sportspeople in Norway
Expatriate women's footballers in Norway
VSK Aarhus (women) players
Women's association football midfielders
Lindsey Wilson Blue Raiders women's soccer players
AGF Fodbold (women) players